Conway Ballantyne Sonne (December 28, 1917 – June 30, 1995) was a Standard Oil Company of California employee, the author of several books, and a prominent leader in the Church of Jesus Christ of Latter-day Saints (LDS Church) in Palo Alto, California.

Biography 
Sonne was born in Logan, Utah to Alma Sonne, who would later become a general authority in the LDS Church.  As a young man, Conway Sonne was a Mormon missionary in the LDS Church's New England States Mission.

Sonne received a bachelor's degree from Utah State University and an MBA from Harvard Business School.

From 1943 to 1946 Sonne served as a financial analyst and liaison officer with the United States Army Quartermaster Corps. From 1949 to 1981 he served as a financial officer of Standard Oil.  He also served as a trustee of the National Maritime Museum Association.

In the LDS Church, Sonne served as a first counselor in the bishopric of the Palo Alto Ward, a member of the high council of the Palo Alto Stake, and in several other callings.

The books Sonne wrote were Knight of the Kingdom: The Story of Richard Ballantyne (1949), What Would You Write (1956), World of Wakara (1962), Saints on the Sea, A Maritime History of Mormon Migration (1983), Ships, Saints, and Mariners: A Maritime Encyclopedia of Mormon Migration (1987), and A Man Named Alma (1988), which was a biography of his father.

Sonne and his wife Elain Winch had four sons.

References 
 biography connected with his papers at the Utah State University
 Obituary of Sonne

External links 
 
 Conway B. Sonne, “Under Sail to Zion,” Ensign, July 1991, p. 7

1917 births
1995 deaths
20th-century Mormon missionaries
American energy industry businesspeople
American Latter Day Saint writers
American Mormon missionaries in the United States
Harvard Business School alumni
Historians of the Latter Day Saint movement
Writers from Logan, Utah
Utah State University alumni
American leaders of the Church of Jesus Christ of Latter-day Saints
20th-century American historians
20th-century American businesspeople